The Shakespeare Theatre Company is a regional theatre company in Washington, D.C., United States. The theatre company focuses primarily on plays from the Shakespeare canon, but its seasons include works by other classic playwrights such as Euripides, Henrik Ibsen and Oscar Wilde.

The following is a chronological list of the productions that have been staged since its inception.

1986-1987
Romeo and Juliet - by William Shakespeare
La Mandragola - by Niccolò Machiavelli
The Winter's Tale - by William Shakespeare
Love's Labour's Lost - by William Shakespeare

1987-1988
The Witch of Edmonton - by William Rowley, Thomas Dekker and John Ford
All's Well That Ends Well - by William Shakespeare
Macbeth - by William Shakespeare
The Merchant of Venice - by William Shakespeare

1988-1989
Antony and Cleopatra - by William Shakespeare
Richard II - by William Shakespeare
The Beggar's Opera - by John Gay
As You Like It - by William Shakespeare

1989-1990
Twelfth Night - by William Shakespeare
The Tempest - by William Shakespeare
Mary Stuart - by Friedrich von Schiller
The Merry Wives of Windsor - by William Shakespeare

1990-1991
Richard III - by William Shakespeare
Othello - by William Shakespeare
Fuente Ovejuna - by Lope de Vega
King Lear - by William Shakespeare
The Merry Wives of Windsor - by William Shakespeare

1991-1992
Coriolanus - by William Shakespeare
Saint Joan - by George Bernard Shaw
Much Ado About Nothing - by William Shakespeare
Measure for Measure - by William Shakespeare
As You Like It - by William Shakespeare

1992-1993
Troilus and Cressida - by William Shakespeare
Hamlet - by William Shakespeare
The Comedy of Errors - by William Shakespeare
Mother Courage and Her Children - by Bertolt Brecht
Much Ado About Nothing - by William Shakespeare

1993-1994
Richard II - by William Shakespeare
Julius Caesar - by William Shakespeare
Romeo and Juliet - by William Shakespeare
The Doctor's Dilemma - by George Bernard Shaw
The Comedy of Errors - by William Shakespeare

1994-1995
Henry IV, part 1 - by William Shakespeare
Henry IV, part 2 - by William Shakespeare
The School for Scandal - by Richard Brinsley Sheridan
Love's Labour's Lost - by William Shakespeare
The Taming of the Shrew - by William Shakespeare
Twelfth Night - by William Shakespeare

1995-1996
Macbeth - by William Shakespeare
Henry V - by William Shakespeare
All's Well That Ends Well - by William Shakespeare
Volpone - by Ben Jonson
Measure for Measure - by William Shakespeare

1996-1997
Henry VI, part 1 - by William Shakespeare
Henry VI, part 2 - by William Shakespeare
Henry VI, part 3 - by William Shakespeare
Antony and Cleopatra - by William Shakespeare
As You Like It - by William Shakespeare
Mourning Becomes Electra - by Eugene O'Neill
Henry V - by William Shakespeare

1997-1998
The Tempest - by William Shakespeare
Othello - by William Shakespeare
Peer Gynt - by Henrik Ibsen
The Merry Wives of Windsor - by William Shakespeare
Sweet Bird of Youth - by Tennessee Williams
All's Well That Ends Well - by William Shakespeare

1998-1999
A Woman of No Importance - by Oscar Wilde
Twelfth Night - by William Shakespeare
King John - by William Shakespeare
The Trojan Women - by Euripides
The Merchant of Venice - by William Shakespeare
The Merry Wives of Windsor - by William Shakespeare

1999-2000
King Lear - by William Shakespeare
A Midsummer Night's Dream - by William Shakespeare
Coriolanus - by William Shakespeare
The Country Wife - by William Wycherley
Camino Real - by Tennessee Williams
The Merchant of Venice - by William Shakespeare

2000-2001
Timon of Athens - by William Shakespeare
Richard II - by William Shakespeare
Don Carlos - by Friedrich Schiller
The Two Gentlemen of Verona - by William Shakespeare
Hedda Gabler - by Henrik Ibsen
King Lear - by William Shakespeare

2001-2002
Oedipus the King - by Sophocles
Oedipus at Colonus - by Sophocles
Antigone - by Sophocles
Hamlet - by William Shakespeare
The Duchess of Malfi - by John Webster
Romeo and Juliet - by William Shakespeare
The Little Foxes - by Lillian Hellman
The Two Gentlemen of Verona - by William Shakespeare

2002-2003
The Winter's Tale - by William Shakespeare
Much Ado about Nothing - by William Shakespeare
The Silent Woman - by Ben Jonson
Richard III - by William Shakespeare
Ghosts - by Henrik Ibsen
Hamlet - by William Shakespeare

2003-2004
The Rivals - by Richard Brinsley Sheridan
A Midsummer Night's Dream - by William Shakespeare
Henry IV, part 1 - by William Shakespeare
Henry IV, part 2 - by William Shakespeare
Five by Tenn - by Tennessee Williams
Cyrano de Bergerac - by Edmond Rostand
Much Ado about Nothing - by William Shakespeare

2004-2005
Macbeth - by William Shakespeare
Pericles - by William Shakespeare
Lorenzaccio - by Alfred de Musset
The Tempest - by William Shakespeare
Lady Windermere's Fan - by Oscar Wilde
A Midsummer Night's Dream - by William Shakespeare

2005-2006
Othello - by William Shakespeare
The Comedy of Errors - by William Shakespeare
Don Juan - by Molière
The Persians - by Aeschylus
Love's Labour's Lost - by William Shakespeare
Pericles - by William Shakespeare

2006-2007
An Enemy of the People - by Henrik Ibsen
The Beaux' Stratagem - by George Farquhar
Richard III - by William Shakespeare
Titus Andronicus - by William Shakespeare
Hamlet - by William Shakespeare
Love's Labour's Lost - by William Shakespeare

2007-2008
The Taming of the Shrew - by William Shakespeare
Edward II - by Christopher Marlowe
Tamburlaine - by Christopher Marlowe
On the Eve of Friday Morning - by Norman Allen
Argonautika - by Mary Zimmerman
Major Barbara - by George Bernard Shaw
Antony and Cleopatra - by William Shakespeare
Julius Caesar - by William Shakespeare
The Imaginary Invalid - by Molière

2008-2009
Romeo and Juliet - by William Shakespeare
The Way of the World - by William Congreve
Twelfth Night - by William Shakespeare
The Dog in the Manger - by Lope de Vega
Ion - by Euripides
Design for Living - by Noël Coward
King Lear - by William Shakespeare

2009-2010
Fully staged productions
The Alchemist - by Ben Jonson
As You Like It - by William Shakespeare
Richard II - by William Shakespeare
Henry V - by William Shakespeare
The Liar - by Pierre Corneille
Mrs. Warren's Profession - by George Bernard Shaw

Shakespeare Theatre Company Presentations
Phèdre - by Jean Racine featuring Helen Mirren produced by The Royal National Theatre (Great Britain)

2010-2011
Fully staged productions
All's Well That Ends Well - by William Shakespeare
Candide - by Leonard Bernstein based on the novella by Voltaire
Cymbeline - by William Shakespeare
An Ideal Husband - by Oscar Wilde
Old Times - by Harold Pinter
The Merchant of Venice - by William Shakespeare

Shakespeare Theatre Company Presentations
The Great Game: Afghanistan''' short plays by many authors - produced by the Tricycle Theatre in LondonBlack Watch, by Gregory Burke - produced by National Theatre of Scotland

2011-2012
Fully staged productionsThe Heir Apparent - by Jean-François Regnard and translated by David IvesMuch Ado About Nothing - by William ShakespeareThe Two Gentlemen of Verona - by William ShakespeareStrange Interlude - by Eugene O'NeillThe Servant of Two Masters - by Carlo GoldoniThe Merry Wives of Windsor - by William Shakespeare

Musical in Concert seriesThe Boys from Syracuse - by Richard Rodgers, Lorenz Hart and George AbbottTwo Gentlemen of Verona, A Rock Opera - by John Guare, Mel Shapiro and Galt MacDermot

Shakespeare Theatre Company PresentationsFela! Directed & Choreographed by Bill T. Jones, Produced by Jay-Z, Will Smith & Jada Pinkett SmithKrapp's Last Tape - by Samuel Beckett featuring John Hurt from Ireland's Gate Theatre

2012-2013
Fully staged productionsThe Government Inspector - by Nikolai Gogol adapted by Jeffrey HatcherA Midsummer Night's Dream - by William ShakespeareHughie - by Eugene O'NeillCoriolanus - by William ShakespeareWallenstein - by Friedrich Schiller adapted by Robert PinskyThe Winter's Tale - by William Shakespeare

Shakespeare Theatre Company PresentationsBlack Watch - by Gregory Burke - produced by National Theatre of ScotlandThe Strange Undoing of Prudencia Hart - created by David Greig and Wils Wilson - produced by National Theatre of ScotlandLes Liaisons Dangereuses - by Pierre Choderlos de Laclos, directed by John MalkovichFela! Directed & Choreographed by Bill T. Jones, Produced by Jay-Z, Will Smith & Jada Pinkett Smith

2013-2014
Fully staged productionsMeasure for Measure - by William ShakespeareA Funny Thing Happened on the Way to the Forum - music & lyrics by Stephen Sondheim book by Burt Shevelove & Larry GelbartThe Importance of Being Earnest - by Oscar WildeHenry IV, Parts 1 and 2 - by William Shakespeare staged in revolving repertoryPrivate Lives - by Noël Coward
Shakespeare Theatre Company Presentations
 Potted Potter – The Unauthorized Harry Experience – A Parody by Daniel Clarkson and Jefferson Turner Mies Julie by Yael Farber based on Miss Julie by August Strindberg produced by the Baxter Theatre Centre at the University of Cape Town in association with South African Theatre Association.Man in a Case Adapted from The Man in a Case & About Love by Anton Chekhov Featuring Mikhail Baryshnikov Produced by Baryshnikov Productions in association with ArKtype/Thomas O. KriegsmannBrief Encounter, by Emma Rice, based on the 1945 movie Brief Encounter and Still Life by Noël Coward produced by the Kneehigh Theatre

2014-2015
Fully staged productions As You Like It - by William ShakespeareThe Tempest - by William ShakespeareThe Metromaniacs - by Alexis Piron, translated by David IvesMan of La Mancha - book by Dale Wasserman, lyrics by Joe Darion and music by Mitch LeighTartuffe - by Molière
Shakespeare Theatre Company PresentationsThe Magic Flute - Impempe Yomlingo - adapted from Mozart's The Magic Flute by the Isango Ensemble Repertory Venus and Adonis - adapted from the Shakespeare poem by the Isango Ensemble Repertory*Dunsinane by David Greig by the National Theatre of Scotland and Royal Shakespeare Company
* Part of the 2014-15 subscription series

2015-2016
Fully staged productions Salomé - adapted by Yaël FarberKiss Me, Kate - music and lyrics by Cole Porter and book by Samuel and Bella SpewackThe Critic - by Richard Brinsley Sheridan and adapted by Jeffrey Hatcher and The Real Inspector Hound by Tom StoppardOthello - by William Shakespeare1984 - by George Orwell and adapted by Robert Icke and Duncan MacmillanThe Taming of the Shrew - by William Shakespeare

2016-2017
Fully staged productions Romeo and Juliet - by William ShakespeareThe Secret Garden - by Marsha Norman and Lucy Simon and based on the novel by Frances Hodgson BurnettKing Charles III - by Mike BartlettThe Select (The Sun Also Rises) - adapted by Elevator Repair Service, based on a novel by Ernest HemingwayMacbeth - by William ShakespeareThe School for Lies - adapted by David Ives and based on a play by Molière

2017-2018
Fully staged productions The Lover and The Collection - by Harold PinterTwelfth Night - by William ShakespeareHamlet - by William ShakespeareNoura - by Heather RaffoWaiting for Godot - by Samuel Beckett and created by DruidCamelot'' - book and lyrics by Alan Jay Lerner and music by Frederick Loewe

References

External links
The Shakespeare Theatre website

Theatre company production histories